The fourth season of Australian Survivor is a television series based on the international reality game show franchise Survivor. It is the second season to air on the Network Ten, following the network acquiring the broadcast rights to the Australian Survivor franchise in late 2015. Jonathan LaPaglia returned to host the series for his second season.

The season premiered on 30 July 2017. Like the previous season, the program was filmed on the Samoan island of Upolu and featured 24 Australian castaways competing for 55 days in the Samoan jungle for a grand prize of A$500,000. On 10 October 2017, Jericho Malabonga was revealed to be the winner over Tara Pitt by a vote of 6–3.

Production

Casting
The series was renewed on 23 October 2016. Upon the announcement of renewal, a casting call was made for potential contestants for the new season. Over 20,000 people applied for the new season.

Twists
This season featured multiple game-play twists for the first time in the series. This season introduced the super-idol which had the power to nullify the use of any other idol at one tribal council (not to be confused with the post-vote negating idol seen first in the American format's Panama season). This season also introduced several 'moral dilemmas' into the game which forced contestants to choose between two luxuries; one that benefits the entire tribe and one that only benefits the finder.

This season also saw the return of non-elimination episodes from season 3, the first of which saw a double tribal council where two contestants were sequentially voted out and sent to the opposing tribe. The following day, two contestants of the other tribe were then required to volunteer to switch to the tribe to replace them. The second non-elimination episode saw the contestants of one tribe vote for one of their members to receive a reward. The third featured a Tribal Council mutiny and the fourth featured a juror elimination.

This season also introduced a variety of twists previously seen on the American format including the initial marooning, the hiding of an immunity idol at challenges (first seen in Cambodia), tribal mutiny (first seen in Thailand) and jury member elimination (as seen in Kaôh Rōng).

Contestants

Future appearances 
Luke Toki competed on the 2019 edition of Australian Survivor: Champions vs. Contenders as part of the Champions tribe. Mark Herlaar, Jacqui Patterson, Aaron Knight, Henry Nicholson, Locky Gilbert, Michelle Dougan and Jericho Malabonga competed on Australian Survivor: All Stars. Samantha Gash and Mark Wales competed on Australian Survivor: Blood V Water.

Outside of Survivor, Locky appeared on the eighth season of The Bachelor Australia as the titular bachelor in 2020. Aimee competed on the eighth season of Seven Network's House Rules in 2020 and finished as the runner up. Sam and Mark competed on the Amazon Prime Video series World's Toughest Race: Eco-Challenge Fiji as part of Team Aussie Rescue and finished the race in 26th place after 212 hours and 28 minutes. Michelle competed in the tenth episode of The Cube in 2021 with her sister Sam. Luke competed on Big Brother VIP, finishing in first place. Sam and Mark appeared on The Dog House Australia in 2022.

Season summary
The 24 contestants were split into two tribes. On Asaga, Luke and his closest ally Jericho were in the minority and unsuccessfully attempted to upset the balance of power in the tribe. On Samatau, A.K. was on the bottom due to his aggressive strategizing, but he was able to seize control by eliminating Aimee, the closest ally of the tribe's prominent strategist in Locky. Outsiders Tara and Annaliese were sent to Asaga in a fake double elimination, with Ben and Henry taking their place. Luke and Jericho used the opportunity to take control of Asaga, while Samatau went on an immunity run. A second tribe swap sent A.K. & Peter to Asaga and Annaliese & Michelle to Samatau; later, a mutiny twist was offered, and Peter was the only one to accept, sending him back to Samatau.

The merge left Samatau in a 6-5 majority, but the Asaga members convinced the people on the bottom of Samatau to turn against Jarrad and Annaliese, eliminating them both. A new majority composed of Tessa, Michelle, Luke, Peter, Sarah, and Jericho blindsided Henry before Luke caught wind of a plan against Jericho, prompting him to make a move against Tessa. Tara then decided to betray her closest ally Locky due to his status as a threat, but he went on an immunity run that eventually ended with his elimination.

At the Final 4, Jericho won an advantage to remove a member of the jury. He chose Tessa, believing her to be the least likely to vote for him to win, despite her saying that she viewed Tara as the weakest player. Peter was the next intended target, but after he won immunity, he lobbied for Jericho’s elimination. This was foiled after Jericho uncovered the plan and Tara, paranoid after Tessa’s statements, decided to make a big move and force a fire-making challenge between Jericho and Michelle. Jericho ended up winning, and thus Michelle was eliminated. Jericho then won the final immunity challenge and decided to stay true to his new alliance with Tara, voting out Peter.

At the Final Tribal Council, Tara was commended for her strong social game, playing from a minority position and her orchestration of Locky and A.K’s elimination, but chastised for riding Locky’s coattails for far too long, not making enough strategic decisions, and being weak in challenges. Meanwhile, Jericho was congratulated for his very effective method of making alliances and using shields, playing under-the-radar, and winning challenges when he needed to. However he was criticized for his cruelty and hypocrisy, claiming to be a benevolent religious person despite unnecessarily being nasty to Jarrad and Sarah when they were eliminated, riding on Luke’s coattails, and making bad decisions such as removing Tessa from the jury and taking Tara to the end, despite Tessa saying she would be very unlikely to vote for Tara to win. However, Jericho’s strong strategic and physical game was rewarded over Tara’s underdog status, and he was awarded the title of Sole Survivor with six jury votes to Tara’s three.

In the case of multiple tribes or castaways who win reward or immunity, they are listed in order of finish, or alphabetically where it was a team effort; where one castaway won and invited others, the invitees are in brackets.
Notes

Episodes

Voting history
Tribal Phase (Day 1–34)

Individual phase (Day 35–55)

Notes

Reception

Ratings
Ratings data is from OzTAM and represents the viewership from the 5 largest Australian metropolitan centres (Sydney, Melbourne, Brisbane, Perth and Adelaide).

Notes

References

External links
 

2017 Australian television seasons
Australian Survivor seasons
Television shows filmed in Samoa